This is a ' list of :Category:Jewish scientists by country.

AustraliaAustralian Jewish academicsAustriaAustrian Jewish scientistsBeneluxDutch Jewish academicsBrazilBrazilian Jewish scientistsCanada Canadian Jewish academicsCzechoslovakiaCzech and Slovak Jewish scientistsFranceFrench Jewish scientistsGermanyList of German Jewish scientistsHungaryHungarian Jewish scientistsIsraelIsraeli scientistsItalyItalian scientistsPolandPolish Jewish scientistsRussia/Soviet Union (including Ukraine)Russian & Soviet Jewish scientistsScandinaviaList of North European JewsUnited KingdomList of British Jewish scientistsScotlandList of Scottish Jews#Academic figures and scientistsUkraineUkrainian Jewish scientistsUnited StatesJewish American academicsJewish American scientists''

See also
 Lists of Jews
 :Category:Jewish scientists
 List of Jewish Nobel laureates

External links
 JInfo.org, a comprehensive set of lists of Jewish contributions to world civilization. Fuller (copyrighted) lists can be found there.

 
Scientists